Alan Bradford Curtiss is an assistant director and producer of Hollywood films.

Hispanic film 
Curtiss, together with Mexican entrepreneur Max Appedole and award-winning Barrie M. Osborne, released the major 2014 Hispanic film Gloria, a biopic about the life of controversial Mexican pop star Gloria Trevi.

Filmography 
 Gloria (2014)
 World War Z (2013)
 Something Borrowed (2011)
 Love Ranch (2010)
 The Way Back (2010)
 First Sunday (2008)
 The Happening (2008)
 The Prestige (2006)
 Jarhead (2005)
 Christmas with the Kranks (2004)
 Master and Commander: The Far Side of the World (2003)
 Peter Pan (2003)
 Dragonfly (2002)
 Cast Away (2000)
 The Perfect Storm (2000)
 The Green Mile (1999)
 Patch Adams (1998)
 The Truman Show (1998)
 The Devil's Own (1997)
 Michael (1996)
 Get Shorty (1995)
 Ace Ventura: When Nature Calls (1995)
 Waterworld (1995)
 Clear and Present Danger (1994)
 Intersection (1994)
 Fearless (1993)
 Consenting Adults (1992)
 For Richer, for Poorer (1992)
 For the Boys (1991)
 Green Card (1990)
 Taking Care of Business (1990)
 Dead Poets Society (1989)
 Harlem Nights (1989)
 My Stepmother Is An Alien (1988)
 The Presidio (1988)
 Vibes (1988)
 A Tiger's Tale (1987)
 Wanted: Dead or Alive (1987)
 Nothing in Common (1986)
 Clue (1985)
 Jagged Edge (1985)
 The Man With One Red Shoe (1985)
 2010 (1984)
 Cloak & Dagger (1984)
 The Lonely Guy (1984)
 Max Dugan Returns (1983)
 Romantic Comedy (1983)
 I Ought to Be in Pictures (1982)
 Mommie Dearest (1981)
 Coast to Coast (1980)
 Heaven's Gate (1980)
 Grease (1978)
 Moment by Moment (1978)

References 

Living people
Year of birth missing (living people)